List of Florida companies includes notable companies that are, or once were, headquartered in Florida.

Companies based in Florida

A
 A21, Inc.
 Abeka
 Achieva Credit Union
 Acosta Sales & Marketing
 Adecco Group North America 
 ADT Inc.
 Adventure Landing
 Aero Adventure Aviation
 AerSale
 Air Sunshine
 AirScan
 Alienware
 Amerijet International
 American Top Team
 Associated Grocers of Florida
 Association of Tennis Professionals
 AutoNation

B
 Bankers Healthcare Group
 Baptist Health
 Bealls
 Beasley Broadcast Group
 B/E Aerospace
 Bijoux Terner
 Brightline
 Bonefish Grill
 Bloomin' Brands
 Blue Cross and Blue Shield of Florida
 Bombardier Capital
 Burger King

C
 Carnival Corporation & plc
 Carrier Global Corporation
 Checkers and Rally's
 Cheeburger Cheeburger
 Chewy, Inc.
 Chico's
 Citadel LLC
 Citizens First Bank
 Citrix Systems
 Cortera
 Costa Del Mar
 CSX Corporation

D
 Darden Restaurants
 DHL Americas
 Discotek Media
 Discount Home Shoppers' Club
 DiSTI
 Disney Cruise Line
 Disney World Resort
 Demaco

E
 Earlyshares
 Elkins Constructors
 EMR Telemetry
 Equitrac
 EverBank
 Express One International

F
 Fairwinds Credit Union
 Fidelity National Financial
 Firehouse Subs
 FIS
 Fleming's Prime Steakhouse & Wine Bar 
 Florida Credit Union
 Florida East Coast Railway
 Florida Power & Light
 Fresh Del Monte Produce

G
 GEO Group
 GTE Financial
 Gulf Power Company

H
 Hard Rock Cafe
 Harris Corporation
 HEICO
Hertz
 Haskell
 Home Shopping Network

I
 IBC Airways
 IBM Southeast Employees' Credit Union
 Interline Brands
 Ion Media
 Island Company

J
 Jabil
 Jacksonville Jaguars
 Jarden
 JEA
 JetSmarter

K
 Kre8tiveworkz

L
 Landstar System
 Larry's Giant Subs 
 Lennar

M
 Magic Leap
 Marriott Vacations Worldwide Corporation
 The Melting Pot
 MidFlorida Credit Union

N
 National Beverage
 Navarro Discount Pharmacies
 Nemours Foundation
 NextEra Energy
 Norwegian Cruise Line

O
 Odyssey Marine Exploration
 Office Depot
 Outback Steakhouse

P
 Palmetto Canning
 Parkjockey
 People's Trust Insurance Company
 PetMed Express
 PGA Tour
 Piper Aircraft
 Pollo Tropical
 Popeyes
 Publix

R
 Randall Made Knives
 Raymond James Financial
 Rayonier
 Rayonier Advanced Materials
 Reedy Creek Energy Services
 Regency Centers
 Regent Seven Seas Cruises
 Ring Power
 Roper Technologies
 Royal Caribbean International
 Arthur Rutenberg Homes
 Ryder

S
 SBA Communications
 St. Joe Company
 St. Vincent's Medical Center Riverside
 ScribeAmerica
 Seald Sweet International
 SeaWorld Parks and Entertainment
 Sedano's
 Skymax
 Skyway Enterprises
 Songbird Airways
 Space Coast Credit Union
 SpaceX launch facilities 
 Spirit Airlines
 Stein Mart
 Suncoast Credit Union
 Swisher International Group

T
 Tech Data
 TECO Energy
 Telemundo
 Tournament Players Club
 Trailer Bridge
 Trans-Florida Airlines
 Triton Submarines
 Tropical Financial Credit Union
 Tupperware Brands

U
 UF Health Jacksonville
 US Assure
 U.S. Century Bank
 Universal Orlando Resort

V
 Valpak
 Venus Fashion
 Victory Air Transport
 Vistikon
 V-me
 VyStar Financial Group

W
 Watsco
 WellCare
 Westgate Resorts
 Winn-Dixie
 World Atlantic Airlines
 World Fuel Services
 World Golf Village

Companies formerly based in Florida

A
 AirTran Airways
 American Momentum Bank
 Andrx Corporation
 Armor Holdings
 Arrow Air
 Arthur Treacher's
 Atlantic Coast Financial

B
 BankAtlantic
 Barnett Bank

C
 Chalk's International Airlines
 Charter Company
 Chris-Craft Industries
 Circle K 
 Claire's
 Cuppy's Coffee
 Custom Air Transport

E
 Express.Net Airlines

F
 Florida Rock Industries
 Florida Tile
 Florida West International Airways

G
 Guide
 Gulfstream International Airlines

H
 Hawaiian Tropic
 Health Management Associates
 Hooters

J
 Jim Walter Homes

L
 Lynx Air International

M
 Muvico Theaters

P
 Pearl Art and Craft Supply
 PSS World Medical

R
 Rail Management Corporation
 RailAmerica
 Republic Services

S
 SaveRite
 SkyValue
 Spherion
 Stockton, Whatley, Davin & Co.

T
 Tropicana Products

W
 Walter Industries
 Windjammer Barefoot Cruises

X
 XStream Systems

See also
 List of companies based in Miami
 List of companies based in the Jacksonville area

 
Florida